Olivier Pérez González was the Citizens' Action Party (PAC for its Spanish initials). He is a lawyer who graduated from Universidad Autónoma de Centro América (Autonomous University of Central America).

Pérez represented Puntarenas as a deputy between 2006 and 2010. As a deputy, he was Secretary of the Commission on Economic and Tourism Affairs.

Pérez campaigned vigorously on behalf of Luis Guillermo Solís for the presidency, which Solís eventually won. During the campaign, Pérez criticized corruption from the National Liberation Party

Pérez replaced Elizabeth Fonseca Corrales as president of PAC, earning 43 votes to Federico Picado's 26 votes in a party assembly. Pérez claims that he will continue the PAC's open primary system.

References

Living people
People from Puntarenas
Citizens' Action Party (Costa Rica) politicians
Members of the Legislative Assembly of Costa Rica
Year of birth missing (living people)